Rik W. Hafer is an American economist and professor of economics in the Plaster School of Business and Entrepreneurship at Lindenwood University. He is also the Director for the Center of Economics and the Environment in the Hammond Institute for Free Enterprise. Before joining the faculty of Lindenwood in 2016, he taught at Southern Illinois University at Edwardsville (SIUE), where he first became a professor of economics in 1989. While at SIUE he held multiple positions, including Chair of the Department of Economics and Finance, and Distinguished Research Professor of Economics and Finance.  Prior to joining the faculty at SIUE, he worked as a research economist at the Federal Reserve Bank of St. Louis. He has been a Research Fellow with the Show-Me Institute, a consultant to the Central Bank of the Philippines, and a visiting scholar at the Federal Reserve Banks of Atlanta and St. Louis.

References

External links
Faculty page
Profile at the Show-Me Institute

Living people
Washington University in St. Louis faculty
21st-century American economists
Southern Illinois University Edwardsville faculty
Lindenwood University people
Virginia Tech alumni
Monetary economists
Year of birth missing (living people)